Hop, the Bellhop is a 1919 American silent comedy film featuring Oliver Hardy (credited as Babe Hardy).

Cast
 Billy Armstrong as Jumping Jupiter
 Babe Hardy as Solomon Soop

See also
 List of American films of 1919
 Oliver Hardy filmography

External links
Hop, the Bellhop (1919) at Classic Movie Hub (accessed March 1, 2021)
 

1919 films
1919 comedy films
1919 short films
American silent short films
American black-and-white films
Silent American comedy films
American comedy short films
1910s American films